Fighter is a documentary film about Arnošt Lustig (1926–2011) and Jan Wiener (1920–2010), two Jews who return to Europe to revisit the past.

A survivor of Theresienstadt, Auschwitz, and Buchenwald, Lustig was a Prague-based journalist and author. The German-born Wiener escaped from Nazi-occupied Czechoslovakia, and joined the Royal Air Force in Italy.  The film retraces Wiener's escape route, and visits Theresienstadt (where Wiener's mother died), Auschwitz, and Buchenwald.  It received a Special Jury Citation in the 2000 Karlovy Vary International Film Festival, Best Documentary at the Newport International Film Festival, and the audience award at the Hamptons International Film Festival.

References

External links

2000 films
American documentary films
Documentary films about the Holocaust
Films directed by Amir Bar-Lev
2000 documentary films
2000s American films